Pseudocalliergon lycopodioides is a species of moss belonging to the family Amblystegiaceae.

Synonym:
 Drepanocladus lycopodioides (Brid.) Warnst.

References

Amblystegiaceae